Winifred Lily Boys-Smith (7 November 1865 – 1 January 1939) was an English science artist and lecturer, university professor, school principal. She was born in Corsham, Wiltshire, England on 7 November 1865.

Boys-Smith studied at the Girton College, Cambridge between 1891 and 1895. She took the full honours course for natural sciences tripos, however, was only given a certificate as women were not granted degrees at the time.

She taught at Cheltenham Ladies College from 1896 to 1906 and the University of Otago from 1911.

One nephew, John Sandwith Boys Smith, was Master of St John's College, Cambridge and Vice-Chancellor of the University of Cambridge from 1963 to 1965. Another nephew was Humphry Boys Smith DSO and bar DSC RNR, "one of the most successful Merchant Navy officers serving in the RNR during the Second World War."

When Flowering Plants was published in 1903, a review in Nature called the illustrations "unusually good".

Boys-Smith features as one of the Royal Society Te Apārangi's "150 women in 150 words" project in 2017, celebrating the contribution of women to knowledge in New Zealand.

Books illustrated

References

External links 
 Photograph of Boys-Smith in New Zealand
Portrait of Boys-Smith

1865 births
1939 deaths
English artists
Schoolteachers from Wiltshire
Academic staff of the University of Otago
People from Corsham
Botanical illustrators
19th-century English painters
20th-century English painters
Cheltenham Ladies' College faculty
Alumni of Girton College, Cambridge
British emigrants to New Zealand